Dobrava (Doe-bra-va) is a toponym with Slovene origins, used in Slovenia, Austria, Croatia and Italy. It derives from the Proto-Slavic word *dǫbъ meaning "oak". It can be translated into "oak grove" or "oak woods". The term dobrava is used exclusively for Quercus robur. Forests and other oak species have gained different sobriquets in modern usage. Toponyms that derive from the same root word, dob, are often confused with similar Slovene words — particularly dober and dobra, both meaning "good." In contrast to the term dobrava's specificity, however, dober and dobra may be used variably, as names for a miscellany of places.

Slovenia

Villages

Microtoponyms (around 150)

Austria

Microtoponyms

Croatia

Villages 

 Gornja Dubrava - former Dobrava (Međimurska županija / Gornji Mihaljevec)
 Donja Dubrava - former Dobrava (Međimurska županija)

Italy

Microtoponyms 
 Stallo Dobrave (Chiusaforte / Friuli-Venezia Giulia)

Similar toponyms

Similar toponyms in other Slavic languages

References

Slavic toponyms